The farad (symbol: F) is an SI derived unit of electrical capacitance.

Farad or FARAD may also refer to:
Farád, a village in Hungary
Farad, California, a former settlement in United States
Farad Azima, British industrialist, technology entrepreneur and philanthropist
 FARAD, the Faraday Accelerator with Radio-frequency Assisted Discharge

See also
Farhad, given name
Faraday (unit), former unit of electrical charge